Nationality words link to articles with information on the nation's poetry or literature (for instance, Irish or France).

Events
 Sir Roger Newdigate founds the Newdigate Prize for English Poetry at the University of Oxford. The first winner is John Wilson ("Christopher North").
 William Wordsworth completes his first revision of The Prelude: or, Growth of a Poet's Mind in 13 Books, a version started in 1805. It would be further revised later in his life. His work this year and next revised the original, two-part 1798-1799 version. The book is not published in any form until shortly after his death in 1850.
 Following publication of Irish-born poet Thomas Moore's Epistles, Odes, and Other Poems, Francis Jeffrey denounces it in the July Edinburgh Review as "licentious". Moore challenges Jeffrey to a duel in London but their confrontation is interrupted by officials and they become friends.

Works published in English

United Kingdom
 Elizabeth Bath, Poems, on Various Occasions
 James Beresford, The Miseries of Human Life; or, The Groans of Timothy Testy, and Samuel Sensitive, published anonymously
 Robert Bloomfield, Wild Flowers; or, Pastoral and Local Poetry
 Lord Byron, Fugitive Pieces, including "The First Kiss of Love", published anonymously and privately printed; the author's first publication
 John Wilson Croker, The Amazoniad; or, Figure and Fashion, published anonymously
 Thomas Holcroft, Tales in Verse
 Walter Savage Landor, Simonidea
 James Montgomery, The Wanderer of Switzerland, and Other Poems
 Thomas Moore, Epistles, Odes, and Other Poems
 Thomas Love Peacock, Palmyra, and Other Poems
 Mary Robinson, The Poetical Works of the Late Mrs. Mary Robinson (posthumous)
 William Roscoe, The Butterfly's Ball and the Grasshopper's Feast, a children's classic
 Sir Walter Scott, Ballads and Lyrical Pieces
 Jane Taylor and Ann Taylor, Rhymes for the Nursery, including "Twinkle, twinkle, little star"

United States
 Hugh Henry Brackenridge, Gazette Publications By Hugh Henry Brackenridge, Carlisle: Printed by Alexander & Phillips
 Thomas Green Fessenden:
 Democracy Unveiled, or, Tyranny Stripped of the Garb of Patriotism. By Christopher Caustic, L. L. D. &c.&c.&c.&c.&c.&c.&c.&c.&c. In Two Volumes ... Third edition, with large additions (New York: Printed for I. Riley, & Co. The most well-known poetic attack on Thomas Jefferson and other prominent Democratic Republicans; in six cantos of mock-heroic footnotes and including many footnotes
 Original Poems, Philadelphia: Printed at the Lorenzo Press of E. Bronson
 John Blair Linn, Valerian, epic poem on the persecution of early Christians; published unfinished after Linn died of tuberculosis; with an introduction by Charles Brockden Brown, his brother-in-law
 Alexander Wilson, The Foresters, a description of nature and events during a walking trip from Philadelphia to Niagara Falls and back again

Works published in other languages
 Jacques Delille, L'Imagination; France
 Nólsoyar Páll, Fuglakvæði ("Ballad of the Birds"), Faroese, completed

Births
Death years link to the corresponding "[year] in poetry" article:
January 9 – Joseph-Isidore Bédard (died 1833), Canadian poet, lawyer and politician
 January 20 – Nathaniel Parker Willis, also known as N. P. Willis, (died 1867) American author, poet and editor who worked with notable writers including Edgar Allan Poe and Henry Wadsworth Longfellow
 March 6 – Elizabeth Barrett Browning (died 1861), English
 April 17 – William Gilmore Simms (died 1870), American poet, novelist and historian
 date not known – Charles Tompson (died 1883), Australian public servant and said to be the first published Australian-born poet

Deaths
Birth years link to the corresponding "[year] in poetry" article:
 February 19 – Elizabeth Carter (born 1717), English poet, classicist, writer, translator and a prominent member of the Bluestocking circle
 March 3 – Heinrich Christian Boie (born 1744), German author and poet
 May 6 – Ann Yearsley (born c. 1753), English poet and writer
 July 16 – Caterino Mazzolà (born 1745), Italian poet and librettist
 October 19 – Henry Kirke White (born 1785), English
 October 28 – Charlotte Turner Smith (born 1749), English poet and novelist
 date not known – Jupiter Hammon (born 1711), English Colonial American

See also

 Poetry
 List of years in poetry
 List of years in literature
 19th century in literature
 19th century in poetry
 Romantic poetry
 Golden Age of Russian Poetry (1800–1850)
 Weimar Classicism period in Germany, commonly considered to have begun in 1788  and to have ended either in 1805, with the death of Friedrich Schiller, or 1832, with the death of Goethe
 List of poets

Notes

 "A Timeline of English Poetry" Web page of the Representative Poetry Online Web site, University of Toronto

19th-century poetry

Poetry